Before You Go is an album by Buck Owens and his Buckaroos, released in 1965. It is no longer in print.

Reception

In his AllMusic review, critic Richie Unterberger wrote: "This has the usual competent original material and accomplished guitar picking, paced by the number one title track, with occasional instrumentals thrown in for a change of pace."

Track listing

Side one
 "Before You Go" (Buck Owens, Don Rich)
 "Gonna Have Love" (Owens, Red Simpson)
 "Getting Used to Loving You" (Owens, Rich)
 "Steel Guitar Rag" (Leon McAuliffe, Cliff Stone, Merle Travis)
 "No Fool Like an Old Fool" (Owens)
 "I Betcha Didn't Know" (Lamar Morris)

Side two
 "I Want No One But You" (Owens, Simpson)
 "If You Want a Love" (Buck Owens, Bonnie Owens, Don Rich)
 "Number One Heel" (Owens, Owens)
 "Raz-Ma-Taz Polka" (Owens)
 "There's Gonna Come a Day" (Owens)
 "Charlie Brown" (Jerry Leiber, Mike Stoller) with Doyle Holly

References

1965 albums
Buck Owens albums
Capitol Records albums
Albums produced by Ken Nelson (United States record producer)

Albums recorded at Capitol Studios